The U.S. Highways in Florida are the segments of the United States Numbered Highway System maintained by the Florida Department of Transportation (FDOT). Prior to 1993, Florida used colored shields for its U.S. Highways. There are 18 current U.S. Highways in Florida and 2 former U.S. Highways.

Mainline highways

Special routes

See also

References

 
U.S. Highways